The meridian 91° west of Greenwich is a line of longitude that extends from the North Pole across the Arctic Ocean, North America, the Gulf of Mexico, Central America, the Pacific Ocean, the Southern Ocean, and Antarctica to the South Pole.

The 91st meridian west forms a great circle with the 89th meridian east.

From Pole to Pole
Starting at the North Pole and heading south to the South Pole, the 91st meridian west passes through:

{| class="wikitable plainrowheaders"
! scope="col" width="120" | Co-ordinates
! scope="col" | Country, territory or sea
! scope="col" | Notes
|-
| style="background:#b0e0e6;" | 
! scope="row" style="background:#b0e0e6;" | Arctic Ocean
| style="background:#b0e0e6;" |
|-
| 
! scope="row" | 
| Nunavut — Ellesmere Island
|-
| style="background:#b0e0e6;" | 
! scope="row" style="background:#b0e0e6;" | Nansen Sound
| style="background:#b0e0e6;" |
|-
| 
! scope="row" | 
| Nunavut — Axel Heiberg Island
|-
| style="background:#b0e0e6;" | 
! scope="row" style="background:#b0e0e6;" | Norwegian Bay
| style="background:#b0e0e6;" |
|-
| 
! scope="row" | 
| Nunavut — Graham Island and Buckingham Island
|-
| style="background:#b0e0e6;" | 
! scope="row" style="background:#b0e0e6;" | Norwegian Bay
| style="background:#b0e0e6;" |
|-
| 
! scope="row" | 
| Nunavut — Devon Island
|-
| style="background:#b0e0e6;" | 
! scope="row" style="background:#b0e0e6;" | Parry Channel
| style="background:#b0e0e6;" | Barrow Strait
|-
| 
! scope="row" | 
| Nunavut — Somerset Island
|-
| style="background:#b0e0e6;" | 
! scope="row" style="background:#b0e0e6;" | Prince Regent Inlet
| style="background:#b0e0e6;" |
|-
| style="background:#b0e0e6;" | 
! scope="row" style="background:#b0e0e6;" | Gulf of Boothia
| style="background:#b0e0e6;" |
|-
| 
! scope="row" | 
| Nunavut — mainland
|-
| style="background:#b0e0e6;" | 
! scope="row" style="background:#b0e0e6;" | Hudson Bay
| style="background:#b0e0e6;" |
|-
| 
! scope="row" | 
| Nunavut — Marble Island
|-
| style="background:#b0e0e6;" | 
! scope="row" style="background:#b0e0e6;" | Hudson Bay
| style="background:#b0e0e6;" |
|-valign="top"
| 
! scope="row" | 
| Manitoba Ontario — from 
|-
| 
! scope="row" | 
| Minnesota
|-
| style="background:#b0e0e6;" | 
! scope="row" style="background:#b0e0e6;" | Lake Superior
| style="background:#b0e0e6;" |
|-valign="top"
| 
! scope="row" | 
|-
| style="background:#b0e0e6;" | 
! scope="row" style="background:#b0e0e6;" | Gulf of Mexico
| style="background:#b0e0e6;" |
|-valign="top"
| 
! scope="row" | 
|-
| 
! scope="row" | 
|
|-
| 
! scope="row" | 
| Chiapas
|-
| 
! scope="row" | 
|
|-valign="top"
| style="background:#b0e0e6;" | 
! scope="row" style="background:#b0e0e6;" | Pacific Ocean
| style="background:#b0e0e6;" | Passing just west of Pinta Island, Galápagos,  (at ) Passing just west of Santiago Island, Galápagos,  (at )
|-
| 
! scope="row" | 
| Isabela Island, Galápagos
|-
| style="background:#b0e0e6;" | 
! scope="row" style="background:#b0e0e6;" | Pacific Ocean
| style="background:#b0e0e6;" |
|-valign="top"
| style="background:#b0e0e6;" | 
! scope="row" style="background:#b0e0e6;" | Southern Ocean
|-
| 
! scope="row" | Antarctica
| Unclaimed territory
|-
|}

See also
90th meridian west
92nd meridian west

w091 meridian west